Ella and Basie! is a 1963 studio album by Ella Fitzgerald, accompanied by Count Basie and his orchestra, with arrangements by Quincy Jones and Benny Carter. It was later reissued with slightly different cover art as On the Sunny Side of the Street.

Overview

Fitzgerald and the Basie band had recorded together once before, on the 1957 album One O'Clock Jump.

This album is revered alongside Clap Hands, Here Comes Charlie! (1961), Ella Fitzgerald Sings Songs from Let No Man Write My Epitaph (1960), Sings the George and Ira Gershwin Songbook (1959), and Ella in Hollywood (1961) as one of Ella's greatest recordings. The album was rated the 175th best album of the 1960s by Pitchfork.

Track listing
For the 1963 Verve LP album, Verve V6-4061

Side One:
 "Honeysuckle Rose" (Andy Razaf, Fats Waller) – 2:42
 "'Deed I Do" (Walter Hirsch, Fred Rose) – 2:40
 "Into Each Life Some Rain Must Fall" (Doris Fisher, Allan Roberts) – 3:20
 "Them There Eyes" (Maceo Pinkard, Doris Tauber, William Tracey) – 5:04
 "Dream a Little Dream of Me" (Fabian Andre, Gus Kahn, Wilbur Schwandt) – 4:04
 "Tea for Two" (Irving Caesar, Vincent Youmans) – 3:10
Side Two:
"Satin Doll" (Duke Ellington, Johnny Mercer, Billy Strayhorn) – 3:13
 "I'm Beginning to See the Light" (Ellington, Don George, Johnny Hodges, Harry James) – 3:57
 "Shiny Stockings" (Frank Foster, Ella Fitzgerald) – 3:30
 "This Is My Last Affair" (Haven Johnson) – 3:11
 "Ain't Misbehavin'" (Harry Brooks, Razaf, Waller) – 3:06
 "On the Sunny Side of the Street" (Dorothy Fields, Jimmy McHugh) – 3:00

Bonus Tracks; Issued on the 1997 Verve CD Reissue, Verve 539 059-2

"My Last Affair" (Alternative take) – 3:26
"My Last Affair" (Alternative take) – 3:39
"Robbins Nest" (Breakdown) (Illinois Jacquet, Bob Russell, Sir Charles Thompson) – 1:22
"Robbins Nest" (Previously unreleased) – 3:40
"Robbins Nest" (Alternative take) – 3:09
"Robbins Nest" (Alternative take) – 2:55

Personnel
 Ella Fitzgerald – vocals
 The Count Basie Orchestra:
 Count Basie – piano, organ
 Sonny Cohn, Al Aarons, Joe Newman, Don Rader – trumpet
 Eric Dixon – flute, tenor saxophone
 Frank Foster, Frank Wess – flute, alto saxophone, tenor saxophone
 Charlie Fowlkes – baritone saxophone
 Freddie Green – guitar
 Benny Powell, Urbie Green, Henry Coker, Grover Mitchell – trombone
 Flip Ricard – trombone, trumpet
 Marshal Royal – clarinet, alto saxophone
 Buddy Catlett – double bass
 Sonny Payne – drums
 Quincy Jones and Benny Carter – Arrangements
 Val Valentin – recording engineer
 Jay Thompson – cover photo

References

External links

1963 albums
Albums arranged by Quincy Jones
Albums produced by Norman Granz
Collaborative albums
Count Basie Orchestra albums
Ella Fitzgerald albums
Verve Records albums